Gottberg is a surname. Notable people with the surname include:

 Curt von Gottberg (1896–1945), German Nazi official and SS commander
  (born 1964), Finnish painter
 Wilhelm von Gottberg (born 1940), German politician